Alma Kruger (September 13, 1871 – April 5, 1960) was an American actress.

Career
Born in Pittsburgh, Pennsylvania in 1871 (or 1868 according to other sources), Kruger had a long career on stage before appearing in films. From 1907 to 1935, she featured in theatre plays on Broadway, mostly in Shakespearean plays such as Hamlet (as Gertrude), Twelfth Night (as Olivia), Taming of the Shrew (Widow), and The Merchant of Venice (Nerissa).

Kruger was brought to Hollywood by Samuel Goldwyn. She appeared in her first film These Three (1936) while in her 60s. She then proceeded to act in over 40 films in the space of little more than a decade. Among her notable roles was Nurse Molly Byrd, the superintendent of nurses in the popular Dr. Kildare/Dr. Gillespie film series, appearing in all but the first two of the 16 movies. 

She portrayed Empress Maria Theresa of Austria in Marie Antoinette (1938) and the almost mother-in-law of Rosalind Russell's lead character in His Girl Friday (1940), after already playing an in-law to Russell's character four years earlier in Craig's Wife. In 1942, she appeared as the subversive society matron Henrietta Sutton in Alfred Hitchcock's Saboteur (1942). Kruger's last film appearance was in the film Forever Amber (1947).

On radio, Kruger played Emily Mayfield on Those We Love and the captain's wife on Show Boat.

Death
Kruger died of natural causes April 5, 1960 in a nursing home in Seattle, Washington.

Filmography

 These Three (1936) – Mrs. Amelia Tilford
 Craig's Wife (1936) – Ellen Austen
 Love Letters of a Star (1936) – Veronica Todd
 The Mighty Treve (1937) – Mrs. Davis
 Breezing Home (1937) – Mrs. Evans
 The Man in Blue (1937) – Mrs. Dunne
 Vogues of 1938 (1937) – Sophie Miller
 One Hundred Men and a Girl (1937) – Mrs. Tyler
 The Toy Wife (1938) – Madame Vallaire
 Marie Antoinette (1938) – Empress Maria Theresa
 Mother Carey's Chickens (1938) – Aunt Bertha
 Tarnished Angel (1938) – Mrs. Harry Stockton
 The Great Waltz (1938) – Mrs. Strauss
 Made for Each Other (1939) – Sister Madeline
 Calling Dr. Kildare (1939) – Molly Byrd
 The Secret of Dr. Kildare (1939) – Head Nurse Molly Byrd
 Balalaika (1939) – Mrs. Danchenoff
 His Girl Friday (1940) – Mrs. Baldwin
 Dr. Kildare's Strange Case (1940) – Molly Byrd, Superintendent of Nurses
 Anne of Windy Poplars (1940) – Mrs. Stephen Pringle
 Dr. Kildare Goes Home (1940) – Molly Byrd
 You'll Find Out (1940) – Aunt Margo
 Dr. Kildare's Crisis (1940) – Molly Byrd
 Blonde Inspiration (1941) – Victoria
 The Trial of Mary Dugan (1941) – Dr. Saunders
 The People vs. Dr. Kildare (1941) – Molly Byrd
 Puddin' Head (1941) – Molly Byrd
 Dr. Kildare's Wedding Day (1941) – Molly Byrd
 Dr. Kildare's Victory (1942) – Molly Byrd
 Saboteur (1942) – Mrs. Sutton
 Calling Dr. Gillespie (1942) – Molly Byrd
 Dr. Gillespie's New Assistant (1942) – Molly Byrd
 That Other Woman (1942) – Grandma Borden
 Dr. Gillespie's Criminal Case (1943) – Molly Byrd
 Three Men in White (1944) – Molly Byrd
 Our Hearts Were Young and Gay (1944) – Mrs. Lamberton
 Babes on Swing Street (1944) – Martha Curtis
 Mrs. Parkington (1944) – Mrs. Jacob Livingstone (uncredited)
 Between Two Women (1945) – Nurse Molly Byrd
 Crime Doctor's Warning (1945) – Mrs. Wellington Lake (uncredited)
 Colonel Effingham's Raid (1946) – Mrs. Clyde Manadue (uncredited)
 Do You Love Me (1946) – Mrs. Joshua Frederick Crackleton (uncredited)
 A Scandal in Paris (1946) – Marquise De Pierremont
 Fun on a Weekend (1947) – Mrs. Van Orsdale
 Dark Delusion (1947) – Molly Byrd
 Forever Amber (1947) – Lady Redmond (final film role)

References

External links

 
 

1960 deaths
Actresses from Pittsburgh
American stage actresses
American film actresses
American radio actresses
American Shakespearean actresses
Year of birth uncertain
20th-century American actresses
19th-century births